The Goulais River (Pronounced: goo-lee) is a river in northern Ontario, Canada, which rises in the Algoma highlands and empties into Goulais Bay on eastern Lake Superior near Sault Ste. Marie, Ontario.

The river and its tributaries were used to transport logs to local sawmills during the second half of the 19th century. The Algoma Central Railway travels up the river valley on its way to the Agawa canyon.

At one time, the river was an important spawning area for lake sturgeon. However, logging operations, fishing and the installation of an electric barrier to prevent sea lampreys from travelling upstream (removed in 1960) have reduced sturgeon activity in the river.

The river is used for recreational canoeing, kayaking, and swimming, and the headwaters and parts of the river have been protected by the Goulais River Provincial Park.

The river's name is thought to come from the French word goulet or "narrow passage", which is also the source of the English words "gully" and "gullet". The French called the area at the river's mouth Anse de la pêche or "Fish Inlet".

The Goulais River is a popular yellow pickerel fishing area.  The river is also home to bass, brook trout, and other species.

Goulais River Provincial Park

Since 2003, a  section of the river is protected in the Goulais River Provincial Park. It is a waterway park consisting of a strip of land along both shores of the river. Some of its features includes shoreline wetlands, falls, a lake section, and stretches through talus slopes and bedrock resembling rock gardens. It is home to a self-sustaining brook trout population.

As a non-operating park, there are no visitor facilities and services.

See also
List of Ontario rivers

References

External links

Rivers of Algoma District